Steven B. Smith (born 1951) is the Alfred Cowles Professor of Political Science at Yale University. From 1996 to 2011 he was the Master of Branford College at Yale.

Early life and education
Steven Smith was born in 1951. He received his undergraduate degree from University of Tennessee at Chattanooga and continued his studies at Durham University (St Cuthbert's Society), where he completed an MPhil in 1976, with his thesis written on the social and political doctrine of G. W. F. Hegel.

Career
In 1981 Steven Smith received his Ph.D. from the University of Chicago. He was briefly employed as an assistant professor at the University of Texas at Austin before his 1984 arrival at Yale, where he was granted tenure in 1990. At Yale, he has served in many prominent administrative positions while continuing his research. His areas of expertise are the history of political philosophy and the role of statecraft in constitutional government. He has served as Director of Graduate Studies in Political Science, Director of the Special Program in the Humanities, and Acting Chair of Judaic Studies and from 1996-2011 served as the Master of Branford College. He is an honorary member of Manuscript Society. He has received several awards and prizes including the Ralph Waldo Emerson Prize given by Phi Beta Kappa and the Lex Hixon ‘63 Prize for Teaching Excellence in the Social Sciences in 2009. Smith describes himself as an East Coast Straussian.

His books include Spinoza, Liberalism and Jewish Identity (1997), Spinoza's Book of Life (2003), Reading Leo Strauss (2006), The Cambridge Companion to Leo Strauss (2009), Political Philosophy (2012) and his latest, Modernity and Its Discontents (2016).

He is married and has one son.

References

External links
Yale University
Branford College
Academic Earth Political Philosophy Course
"Introduction to Political Philosophy" - Smith's OpenYale Course

Living people
American political scientists
University of Chicago alumni
Yale University faculty
University of Tennessee at Chattanooga alumni
1951 births
Spinoza scholars
Alumni of St Cuthbert's Society, Durham